Senganam is a village in the Jamia Nagar of South East district, New Delhi, India.

Demographics 

As per the 2001 census, Senganam had a total population of 695 with 351 males and 344 females. Out of the total population, only 483 people were literate.

Culture 
The church of St. Francis Xavier in Senganam is over 400 years old, it has been established by Aathy in 1606 AD. Aathy have had bought the whole land which is called in the name of Rama Sundhara Puram in 1571 AD

St. Francis Xavier church is located at Aathy Fort, Senganam, which was formerly named as "Rama Sundhara Puram" in those days (1600s). The church of St. Michael the Archangel is also located nearby. Mariamman temple, Thaththa kovil, அருள்தரும் சிவகாமியம்மை உடனாகிய ஆனந்தமாநடராசப் பெருமான் எம்பிரான் மணிவாசகப் பெருமான் திருக்கோயில் is also located in Senganam village.

References

Villages in Pudukkottai district